The Ramparts We Watch is a 1940 American drama film, the first of four full-length features produced by The March of Time, which was much more well known for the series of newsreels they produced from 1935 to 1951.  The picture was produced and directed by Louis de Rochemont, from a screenplay by Robert L. Richards and Cedric R. Worth, and was distributed by RKO Radio Pictures, who released it on August 16, 1940.

The film used no professional actors, instead relying on residents of the town where most of the filming took place: New London, Connecticut. It also used footage from a Nazi propaganda film, Feuerteufe (Baptism of Fire).

References

External links

1940 films
American black-and-white films
1940 drama films
Films directed by Louis de Rochemont
The March of Time films
American drama films
1940s American films